Eunidia obliquealbovittatoides is a species of beetle in the family Cerambycidae found in Botswana. It was described by Stephan von Breuning in 1986.

References

Eunidiini
Insects of Botswana
Beetles described in 1986